Old Folks may refer to:
"Old Folks" (1938 song), jazz standard by Willard Robison and Dedette Lee Hill, recorded by Larry Clinton, Miles Davis, and others
"Old Folks" (Ronnie Milsap and Mike Reid song), country song by Mike Reid, recorded by Ronnie Milsap and Mike Reid (1988)
"Old Folks", alternative music song and single by the band A from their album 'A' vs. Monkey Kong (1999)

See also
"Old Folks at Home", a song by Stephen Foster